Ovchinnikovo is a rural locality (a selo) in Kontoshinsky Selsoviet, Kosikhinsky District, Altai Krai, Russia. The population was 203 as of 2013. There are 10 streets.

Geography 
Ovchinnikovo is located 30 km southwest of Kosikha (the district's administrative centre) by road. Kontoshino is the nearest rural locality.

References 

Rural localities in Kosikhinsky District